Ivanhoe is a census-designated place (CDP) in Sampson County, North Carolina, United States. The population was 311 at the 2000 census.

History
The Beatty-Corbett House, Black River Presbyterian and Ivanhoe Baptist Churches, and Delta Farm were listed on the National Register of Historic Places in 1986.

Geography
Ivanhoe is located at  (34.595158, -78.234380).

 5.0 square miles (13.0 km2)  is land and 0.20% is water.

Demographics

As of the census of 2000, there were 311 people, 113 households, and 83 families residing in the CDP. The population density was 61.9 people per square mile (23.9/km2). There were 123 housing units at an average density of 24.5/sq mi (9.4/km2). The racial makeup of the CDP was 21.54% White, 70.74% African American, 0.32% Native American, 0.64% Asian, 6.11% from other races, and 0.64% from two or more races. Hispanic or Latino of any race were 8.68% of the population.

There were 113 households, out of which 35.4% had children under the age of 18 living with them, 49.6% were married couples living together, 19.5% had a female householder with no husband present, and 26.5% were non-families. 22.1% of all households were made up of individuals, and 12.4% had someone living alone who was 65 years of age or older. The average household size was 2.61 and the average family size was 3.10.

In the CDP, the population was spread out, with 26.7% under the age of 18, 6.8% from 18 to 24, 30.2% from 25 to 44, 22.5% from 45 to 64, and 13.8% who were 65 years of age or older. The median age was 39 years. For every 100 females, there were 98.1 males. For every 100 females age 18 and over, there were 101.8 males.

The median income for a household in the CDP was $22,500, and the median income for a family was $32,917. Males had a median income of $20,000 versus $18,458 for females. The per capita income for the CDP was $11,305. About 6.8% of families and 6.2% of the population were below the poverty line, including none of those under age 18 and 16.3% of those age 65 or over.

References

Census-designated places in North Carolina
Census-designated places in Sampson County, North Carolina